The Labor Party was a short-lived political party in the Territory of Hawaii. It was founded to support William Charles Achi in his campaign for Mayor of Honolulu in 1908 but lost.

Further reading 
 Home Rulers Draw First Blood in the Political Campaign. The Hawaiian gazette. (Honolulu [Oahu, Hawaii]), 06 Oct. 1908. Chronicling America: Historic American Newspapers. Lib. of Congress. <http://chroniclingamerica.loc.gov/lccn/sn83025121/1908-10-06/ed-1/seq-3/>*

Political parties in Hawaii
Political parties established in 1908
1908 establishments in Hawaii
Labor parties in the United States